The Broncos–Raiders rivalry is a National Football League (NFL) rivalry between the Denver Broncos and Las Vegas Raiders. Both teams compete in the American Football Conference (AFC) West division. Since the American Football League was established in 1960, the Broncos and Raiders are the most frequent Monday Night Football matchup in league history. The Broncos and the Raiders have shared the same division, first being the AFL Western Conference, and since the AFL–NFL merger, the AFC West.

Notable moments

1977–1994
 1977 season: The 1977 Raiders were the defending Super Bowl champions, whereas the Broncos had never qualified for postseason play — AFL or NFL. On October 16, the 4–0 Broncos defeated the 4–0 Raiders in Oakland, ending the Raiders' 17-game winning streak in a game where Raiders' quarterback Ken Stabler threw seven interceptions. Two weeks later, the Raiders would defeat the Broncos in Denver. In the playoffs, the Broncos, competing in their first-ever postseason, and second-ever postseason game, defeated the Raiders 20–17 at Mile High Stadium to win their first AFC championship.
 September 26, 1988: The Broncos led 24–0 at halftime on Monday Night Football. However, the Raiders sparked one of the largest comebacks in NFL history, winning 30–27 in overtime.
 December 2, 1990: Raiders' defensive tackle Scott Davis blocked a 41-yard field goal attempt by Broncos' kicker David Treadwell in the final seconds for a 23–20 Raiders' win at Mile High Stadium.
 November 10, 1991: The Raiders won 17–16 in Denver, aided by two blocked kicks — an extra-point attempt and a last-second field goal attempt. The Broncos were trailing 17–10 with 8:37 left in the fourth quarter, and attempting to tie the game after a touchdown pass from John Elway to Vance Johnson. However, Raiders' defensive tackle Scott Davis blocked the extra-point attempt by Broncos' kicker David Treadwell. After the Broncos blocked a field goal attempt by Raiders' kicker Jeff Jaeger that would have increased the Raiders' lead with 1:55 left, the Raiders returned the favor, when offensive tackle James Fitzpatrick, playing on special teams, blocked a potential 48-yard game-winning field goal by Treadwell as time expired. It was the second consecutive meeting at Mile High Stadium in which the Raiders blocked a field goal in the game's final seconds.
 January 2 and 9, 1994: In the 1993 season finale (January 2, 1994), the Raiders rallied from a 30–13 deficit to beat the Broncos 33–30 in overtime to make the playoffs and set up another game between the two teams in Los Angeles the following week. Outspoken Raiders' owner Al Davis said before the playoff game that Denver was "scared to death of us." Despite the Broncos' protests, the Raiders won, 42–24.

1995–2004
 1995 season: In , former Raiders' head coach Mike Shanahan, who was in an ongoing contract dispute with owner Al Davis at the time, became the Broncos' new head coach, heightening an already contentious AFC West rivalry. Prior to Shanahan's arrival in Denver, the Broncos had lost 13 out of the previous 15 against the Raiders from 1988 to 1994, but during Shanahan's 14 seasons as their head coach (1995–2008), the Broncos went 21–7 against Oakland.
 November 22, 1999: At the end of a Broncos' 27–21 overtime win in Denver on Monday Night Football, Raiders' safety Charles Woodson and offensive tackle Lincoln Kennedy engaged in a snowball fight with some fans, after being pelted with snowballs from some unruly fans. Woodson threw a snowball that struck a woman in the face, while Kennedy charged into the stands and assaulted a fan after being hit by a snowball.
 November 13, 2000: In the final Monday Night game at Mile High Stadium, Broncos' quarterback Brian Griese suffered a partially separated right shoulder in the second quarter, and after receiving a pain-killing shot and missing only six plays, he led the Broncos on a game-winning drive late in the fourth quarter that resulted in a last-second 41-yard field goal by kicker Jason Elam, for a 27–24 Broncos' win.
 November 11, 2002: The Raiders trounced the Broncos 34–10 in Denver on Monday Night Football. However, the game is notable for an incident between former teammates Bill Romanowski and Shannon Sharpe, in which Romanowski wrestled with and dislocated Sharpe's elbow following an incompletion, forcing Sharpe to miss three games. The two were teammates from 1996 to 2001, however, Romanowski had signed with the Raiders prior to the  season.
 November 28, 2004: In a Sunday night game played in a Denver blizzard, the Broncos grabbed the early lead and appeared to be headed toward an easy victory. However, Raiders' quarterback Kerry Collins led a rally in snowy conditions and offensive tackle Langston Walker, playing on special teams, blocked a game-winning field goal attempt by Broncos' kicker Jason Elam in the game's final seconds for a 25–24 Raiders' win.

2007–present

 September 16, 2007: As Raiders' kicker Sebastian Janikowski kicked what would have been a game-winning field goal in overtime, Broncos' head coach Mike Shanahan called a timeout right before he made it. After the timeout, Janikowski attempted the field goal again, but it hit the upright and missed. The Broncos then won on a field goal by Jason Elam.
 October 24, 2010: The Raiders scored 38 points in the first half in Denver.
 October 11, 2015: The Broncos were nursing a 9–7 lead at Oakland with 7:06 left. The Raiders were attempting to take the lead, until Broncos' cornerback Chris Harris, Jr. stepped in front of a pass by Raiders' quarterback Derek Carr and returned the interception 74 yards for a game-changing touchdown with 6:53 left. The Raiders pulled to within 16–10 late in the game, however, the Broncos' defense and special teams preserved the hard-fought victory.
 November 26, 2017: During the first quarter of a Raiders' 21–14 win in Oakland, Broncos' cornerback Aqib Talib and Raiders' wide receiver Michael Crabtree engaged in an ugly brawl on the sidelines that resulted in both players initially being suspended for two games, but reduced to one game apiece after an appeal. The two had a history of bad blood with each other, in which Talib yanked off a chain from Crabtree's neck, during the teams'  regular season finale in Denver, with Talib repeating his actions that resulted in the brawl with Crabtree. During the play that preceded the brawl, Crabtree also punched Broncos' cornerback Chris Harris, Jr. in the stomach.
 September 16, 2018: In scorching hot temperatures in Denver, the Raiders took a 12–0 lead at halftime, with an ineffective performance by the Broncos' offense. However, Broncos' quarterback Case Keenum led a second half rally, with a 1-yard touchdown on a 4th-down quarterback draw and a 10-play, 62-yard drive, which culminated in a game-winning 36-yard field goal by placekicker Brandon McManus. Broncos' linebacker Shaquil Barrett blocked an extra point attempt of Raiders' placekicker Mike Nugent after a 1-yard touchdown run by Marshawn Lynch just before halftime, which turned out to be the difference of the game.
 December 29, 2019: In the 2019 regular season finale at Denver, Raiders' quarterback Derek Carr pulled the team to within a 16–15 deficit, following a 3-yard touchdown pass to Wide receiver Hunter Renfrow with seven seconds remaining in the game. Instead of going for the game-tying extra point that would have sent the game to overtime, the Raiders opted for a game-winning two-point conversion; however, Carr's pass attempt intended for Renfrow was batted down by Broncos' nose tackle Shelby Harris, preserving the win for the Broncos and denying the Raiders a playoff berth. Earlier in the game, a 5-yard touchdown pass from Carr to Renfrow was overturned by a booth review. On the following play, Raiders' fullback Alec Ingold was stopped inches short of the goal line by the Broncos' defense on fourth down—a questionable call that was unsuccessfully challenged by the Raiders.

Season-by-season results

|-
| 1960
| Tie 1–1
| style="| Broncos  31–14
| style="| Raiders  48–10
| Tie  1–1
| Inaugural season for both franchises and the AFL.  
|-
| 1961
| Tie 1–1
| style="| Broncos  27–24
| style="| Raiders  33–19
| Tie  2–2
| 
|-
| 1962
| style="| 
| style="| Broncos  44–7
| style="| Broncos  23–6
| Broncos  4–2
| 
|-
| 1963
| style="| 
| style="| Raiders  26–10
| style="| Raiders  35–31
| Tie  4–4
|
|-
| 1964
| style="| 
| Tie  20–20
| style="| Raiders  40–7
| Raiders  5–4–1
| 
|-
| 1965
| style="| 
| style="| Raiders  28–20
| style="| Raiders  24–13
| Raiders  7–4–1
| 
|-
| 1966
| style="| 
| style="| Raiders  17–3
| style="| Raiders  28–10
| Raiders  9–4–1
| 
|-
| 1967
| style="| 
| style="| Raiders  21–17
| style="| Raiders  51–0
| Raiders  11–4–1
| Raiders win 1967 AFL Championship, lose Super Bowl II.
|-
| 1968
| style="| 
| style="| Raiders  43–7
| style="| Raiders  33–27
| Raiders  13–4–1
| Raiders lose 1968 AFL Championship.
|-
| 1969
| style="| 
| style="| Raiders  24–14
| style="| Raiders  41–10
| Raiders  15–4–1
| Raiders lose 1969 AFL Championship.
|-

|-
| 
| style="| 
| style="| Raiders  24–19
| style="| Raiders  35–23
| Raiders  17–4–1
| AFL-NFL merger.  Both teams placed in AFC West. 
|-
| 
| style="| 
| style="| Raiders  27–16
| style="| Raiders  21–13
| Raiders  19–4–1
| Raiders win 14 straight meetings.
|-
| 
| Tie 1–1
| style="| Raiders  37–20
| style="| Broncos  30–23
| Raiders  20–5–1
| 
|-
| 
| style="| 
| Tie  23–23
| style="| Raiders  21–17
| Raiders  21–5–2
| Meeting in Oakland was a de facto AFC West Championship Game in the final week of the regular season, with the loser being eliminated from playoff contention.
|-
| 
| Tie 1–1
| style="| Raiders  28–17
| style="| Broncos  20–17
| Raiders  22–6–2
| 
|-
| 
| style="| 
| style="| Raiders  42–17
| style="| Raiders  17–10
| Raiders  24–6–2
| 
|-
| 
| style="| 
| style="| Raiders  17–10
| style="| Raiders  19–6
| Raiders  26–6–2
| Raiders go 24–2–2 against Broncos from 1963 to 1976.  Raiders win Super Bowl XI.
|-
| 
| Tie 1–1
| style="| Raiders  24-14
| style="| Broncos  30-7
| Raiders  27–7–2
| Broncos lose Super Bowl XII.
|- style="font-weight:bold; background:#f2f2f2;"
| 1977 Playoffs
| style="| 
| style="| Broncos  20–17
|
| Raiders  27–8–2
| AFC Championship Game; Broncos' first win over Raiders in Denver since 1962.
|-
| 
| style="| 
| style="| Broncos  14–6
| style="| Broncos  21–6
| Raiders  27–10–2
| Broncos’ first season sweep since 1962.
|-
| 
| style="| 
| style="| Raiders  14–10
| style="| Raiders  27–3
| Raiders  29–10–2
| 
|-

|-
| 
| style="| 
| style="| Raiders  24–21
| style="| Raiders  9–3
| Raiders  31–10–2
| Raiders win Super Bowl XV.
|-
| 
| style="| 
| style="| Broncos  9–7
| style="| Broncos  17–0
| Raiders  31–12–2
| 
|-
| 
| style="| 
| no game
| style="| Raiders  27–10
| Raiders  32–12–2
| Denver meeting cancelled due to the players strike that reduced the season to 9 games; Raiders relocate from Oakland to Los Angeles.
|-
| 
| style="| 
| style="| Raiders  22–7
| style="| Raiders  22–20
| Raiders  34–12–2
| Raiders win Super Bowl XVIII.
|-
| 
| style="| 
| style="| Broncos  16–13(OT)
| style="| Broncos  22–19
| Raiders  34–14–2
| 
|-
| 
| style="| 
| style="| Raiders  17–14(OT)
| style="| Raiders  31–28(OT)
| Raiders  36–14–2
| 
|-
| 
| style="| 
| style="| Broncos  38–36
| style="| Broncos  21–10
| Raiders  36–16–2
| Broncos lose Super Bowl XXI.
|-
| 
| style="| 
| style="| Broncos  30–14
| style="| Broncos  23–17
| Raiders  36–18–2
| The Broncos' final win ever at the Los Angeles Memorial Coliseum; Broncos lose Super Bowl XXII.
|-
| 
| style="| 
| style="| Raiders  30–27(OT)
| style="| Raiders  21–20
| Raiders  38–18–2
| Raiders rally from a 24–0 halftime deficit to win game in Denver.
|-
| 
| Tie 1–1
| style="| Broncos  31–21
| style="| Raiders  16–13(OT)
| Raiders  39–19–2
| First series split since 1977 and the first time that the home team won both meetings since 1961; Broncos lose Super Bowl XXIV.
|-

|-
| 
| style="| 
| style="| Raiders  23–20
| style="| Raiders  14–9
| Raiders  41–19–2
| Raiders block a Broncos' potential game-tying field goal in the last seconds of the Denver meeting.
|-
| 
| style="| 
| style="| Raiders  17–16
| style="| Raiders  16–13
| Raiders  43–19–2
| Raiders block two kicks by the Broncos — an extra point and a potential game-winning field goal in the Denver meeting.
|-
| 
| Tie 1–1
| style="| Broncos  17–13
| style="| Raiders  24–0
| Raiders  44–20–2
| 
|-
| 
| style="| 
| style="| Raiders  23–20
| style="| Raiders  33–30(OT)
| Raiders  46–20–2
| Raiders rally to win the season finale over the Broncos in overtime to clinch home field in AFC Wild Card playoffs against Denver the following week.
|- style="font-weight:bold; background:#f2f2f2;"
| 1993 Playoffs
| style="| 
|
| style="| Raiders  42–24
| Raiders  47–20–2
| AFC Wild Card playoffs — second postseason meeting.
|-
| 
| style="| 
| style="| Raiders  48–16
| style="| Raiders  23–13
| Raiders  49–20–2
| Raiders win the final eight meetings in Los Angeles.
|-
| 
| style="| 
| style="| Broncos  27–0
| style="| Broncos  31–28
| Raiders  49–22–2
| Raiders relocate from Los Angeles back to Oakland. Denver's victory in Oakland in week 17 eliminates the Raiders from playoff contention.
|-
| 
| style="| 
| style="| Broncos  24–19
| style="| Broncos  22–21
| Raiders  49–24–2
|  
|-
| 
| 
| style="| Broncos  31–3
| style="| Raiders  28–25
| Raiders  50–25–2
| Broncos win Super Bowl XXXII.
|-
| 
| style="| 
| style="| Broncos  40–14
| style="| Broncos  34–17
| Raiders  50–27–2
| Broncos win Super Bowl XXXIII.
|-
| 
| style="| 
| style="| Broncos  16–13
| style="| Broncos  27–21(OT)
| Raiders  50–29–2
| 
|-

|-
| 
| style="| 
| style="| Broncos  23–20
| style="| Broncos  33–24
| Raiders  50–31–2
| Jason Elam kicks game-winning field goal in the teams' final meeting at Mile High Stadium.
|-
| 
| Tie 1–1
| style="| Broncos  23–17
| style="| Raiders  38–28
| Raiders  51–32–2
| Broncos open Invesco Field at Mile High (currently known as Empower Field at Mile High).
|-
| 
| style="| 
| style="| Raiders  34–10
| style="| Raiders  28–16
| Raiders  53–32–2
| Bill Romanowski (Raiders) and Shannon Sharpe (Broncos) engage in a brawl in the Denver meeting; Raiders lose Super Bowl XXXVII.
|-
| 
| style="| 
| style="| Broncos  31–10
| style="| Broncos  22–8
| Raiders  53–34–2
| 
|-
| 
| Tie 1–1
| style="| Raiders  25–24
| style="| Broncos  31–3
| Raiders  54–35–2
| Raiders block Broncos' potential game-winning field goal in the final seconds of the Denver meeting.
|-
| 
| style="| 
| style="| Broncos  22–3
| style="| Broncos  31–17
| Raiders  54–37–2
|
|-
| 
| style="| 
| style="| Broncos  13–3
| style="| Broncos  17–13
| Raiders  54–39–2
| 
|-
| 
| Tie 1–1
| style="| Broncos  23–20(OT)
| style="| Raiders  34–20
| Raiders  55–40–2 
| In the Denver meeting, Broncos ice Raiders' kicker Sebastian Janikowski, and Jason Elam later kicks game-winning field goal in overtime.
|-
| 
| Tie 1–1
| style="| Raiders  31–10
| style="| Broncos  41–14
| Raiders  56–41–2
| 
|-
| 
| Tie 1–1
| style="| Raiders  20–19
| style="| Broncos  23–3
| Raiders  57–42–2
| 
|-

|-
| 
| style="| 
| style="| Raiders  59–14
| style="| Raiders  39–23
| Raiders  59–42–2
| Raiders sweep division but miss the playoffs, an NFL first.
|-
| 
| Tie 1–1
| style="| Raiders  23–20
| style="| Broncos  38–24
| Raiders  60–43–2 
| 
|-
| 
| style="| 
| style="| Broncos  37–6
| style="| Broncos  26–13
| Raiders  60–45–2
| 
|-
| 
| style="| 
| style="| Broncos  37–21
| style="| Broncos  34–14
| Raiders  60–47–2
| Broncos lose Super Bowl XLVIII.
|-
| 
| style="| 
| style="| Broncos  47–14
| style="| Broncos  41–17
| Raiders  60–49–2
|
|-
| 
| Tie 1–1
| style="| Raiders  15–12
| style="| Broncos  16–10
| Raiders  61–50–2
| Broncos win eight consecutive meetings from 2011 to 2015; Broncos win Super Bowl 50.
|-
| 
| Tie 1–1
| style="| Broncos  24–6
| style="| Raiders  30–20
| Raiders  62–51–2
|
|-
| 
| Tie 1–1
| style="| Broncos  16–10
| style="| Raiders  21–14
| Raiders  63–52–2 
| Aqib Talib (Broncos) and Michael Crabtree (Raiders) engage in an ugly brawl in the Oakland meeting.
|-
| 
| Tie 1–1
| style="| Broncos  20–19
| style="| Raiders  27–14
| Raiders  64–53–2
| Brandon McManus kicks game-winning field goal in the final seconds of the Denver meeting.
|-
| 
| Tie 1–1
| style="| Broncos  16–15
| style="| Raiders  24–16
| Raiders  65–54–2 
| Broncos deny game-winning two-point conversion by the Raiders in the final seconds in Denver; this was also the Raiders' final game as a California-based franchise.
|-

|-
| 
| style="| 
| style="| Raiders  32–31
| style="| Raiders  37–12
| Raiders  67–54–2 
| Raiders relocate from Oakland to Las Vegas and open Allegiant Stadium. Similar to 2019, the season finale was game in Denver; Raiders attempt for two points, and this time succeed in doing so. Raiders sweep Broncos for first time in ten years.
|-
| 
| style="| 
| style="| Raiders  34–24
| style="| Raiders  17–13
| Raiders  69–54–2
| 
|-
| 
| style="| 
| style="| Raiders  22–16 (OT) 
| style="| Raiders  32–23
| Raiders  71–54–2
|
|- 

|-
| AFL regular season
| style="|
| Raiders 6–3–1
| Raiders 9–1
|
|-
| NFL regular season
| style="|
| Raiders 26–25–1 
| Raiders 29–24
| 
|-
| AFL and NFL regular season
| style="|
| Raiders 32–28–2 
| Raiders 38–25
| 
|-
| NFL postseason
| Tie 1–1
| Broncos 1–0 
| Raiders 1–0
| 1977 AFC Championship Game & 1993 AFC Wild Card playoffs.
|-
| Regular and postseason 
| style="|
| Raiders 32–29–2 
| Raiders 39–25
| 
|-

Connections between the teams

Coaches

Players

Notes

References

External links
 Denver Broncos' official website
 The Denver Post – Complete Broncos Coverage
 Pro Football Hall of Fame – Denver Broncos team history
 Denver Broncos at Sports E-Cyclopedia.org
 Las Vegas Raiders' official website
 San Jose Mercury News – Raiders' coverage
 Las Vegas Raiders at Sports E-Cyclopedia.org
 Pro Football Hall of Fame – Las Vegas Raiders' team history

Denver Broncos
Las Vegas Raiders
National Football League rivalries
Las Vegas Raiders rivalries
Denver Broncos rivalries